The 1976 Australian Rally Championship was a series of six rallying events held across Australia. It was the ninth season in the history of the competition.

Ross Dunkerton and navigator Jeff Beaumont in the Datsun 240Z were the winners of the 1976 Championship.

Season review

The ninth Australian Rally Championship was held over six events across Australia, the season consisting of two events for Victoria and one each for Queensland, New South Wales, South Australia and Western Australia.  The 1976 season saw the domination of the Datsun 240Z of Dunkerton for the second year running, winning convincingly with navigator Jeff Beaumont (four wins and a second).  Their main opposition came from Dean Rainsford and Graham West in the Porsche Carrera.  The results of the season could have been different had it not been for the controversy over the eligibility of George Fury's Datsun 710 Coupe.  This car was FIA homologated and as such was eligible for the international Southern Cross Rally, but deemed to be ineligible for the ARC.

The Rallies

The six events of the 1976 season were as follows.

Round Three – Bega Valley Rally

Round Six – Lutwyche Village Warana Rally

1976 Drivers and Navigators Championships
Final pointscore for 1976 is as follows.

Ross Dunkerton – Champion Driver 1976

Jeff Beaumont – Champion Navigator 1976

References

External links
  Results of Snowy Mountains Rally and ARC results.

Rally Championship
Rally competitions in Australia
1976 in rallying